Martin Harris (May 18, 1783 – July 10, 1875) was an early convert to the Latter Day Saint movement who financially guaranteed the first printing of the Book of Mormon and also served as one of Three Witnesses who testified that they had seen the golden plates from which Joseph Smith said the Book of Mormon had been translated.

Early life
Harris was born in Easton, New York, the second of the eight children born to Nathan Harris and Rhoda Lapham.

According to historian Ronald W. Walker, little is known of his youth. In 1808, Harris married his first cousin Lucy Harris.

Harris served with the 39th regiment of the New York State Militia of Ontario County, New York in the War of 1812. He inherited 150 acres.

Until 1831, Harris lived in Palmyra, New York, where he was a prosperous farmer. Harris's neighbors considered him both an honest and superstitious man. A biographer wrote that Harris's "imagination was excitable and fecund."  For example, Harris once perceived a sputtering candle to be the work of the devil. An acquaintance said that Harris claimed to have seen Jesus in the shape of a deer and walked and talked with him for two or three miles. The local Presbyterian minister called him "a visionary fanatic." A friend, who praised Harris as being "universally esteemed as an honest man," also declared that Harris's mind "was overbalanced by 'marvellousness'" and that his belief in earthly visitations of angels and ghosts gave him the local reputation of being crazy. Another friend said, "Martin was a man that would do just as he agreed with you. But, he was a great man for seeing spooks."  Some Palmyrans, however, remembered Harris as a 'skeptic' who was "not very religious" before the Book of Mormon. Nevertheless, even early anti-Mormons who knew Harris believed that he was "honest," "industrious," "benevolent," and a "worthy citizen."

On Harris's departure from New York with the Latter Day Saints, the local paper wrote: "Several families, numbering about fifty souls, took up their line of march from this town last week for the 'promised land,' among whom was Martin Harris, one of the original believers in the 'Book of Mormon.' Mr. Harris was among the early settlers of this town, and has ever borne the character of an honorable and upright man, and an obliging and benevolent neighbor. He had secured to himself by honest industry a respectable fortune—and he has left a large circle of acquaintances and friends to pity his delusion."

Early interaction with Smith
The Smith family moved to Palmyra in 1816, and in 1824, Harris employed Joseph Smith Sr., to dig a well and a cistern. Smith Sr. reportedly told Harris about the gold plates in 1824. Harris later recounted the first time he saw Joseph Smith use a seer stone, when the latter used it to locate a lost object for Harris.

Role in Anthon transcript

Because Harris wanted assurance of the Book of Mormon's authenticity, Smith transcribed characters from the golden plates to a piece of paper, perhaps the one now known as the Anthon transcript, but there is much to cast doubt on this document being the original as both Harris's and Anthon's accounts describe it differently. In the winter of 1828, Harris took the transcript of characters to New York City, where he met with Charles Anthon, a professor of linguistics at Columbia College. The two men's accounts of the meeting conflict on almost every point. Harris's account is recorded in Smith's History of the Church. According to the account, Harris said that Anthon gave him a certificate verifying the authenticity of the characters and the translations, but that when Anthon learned that Smith claimed to have received the plates from an angel, he took the certificate back and tore it to pieces. Anthon, for his part, gave written accounts in 1834 and 1841. Despite the years in between, both accounts are in good agreement, but there is a contradiction as to whether he had given Harris a written opinion about the transcript or not. In both accounts, Anthon maintained that he told Harris that he (Harris) was a victim of a fraud and not to get involved. In either case, the episode apparently satisfied Harris's doubts about the authenticity of the golden plates and the translation enough to mortgage his farm to have the book printed. Harris's wife continued to oppose his collaboration with Smith.

In both of Anthon's accounts, he states that Harris visited him again after the Book of Mormon was printed and brought him a copy, which Anthon refused to accept. Anthon records that he again advised Harris he had been defrauded and should go straight home and ask to examine the plates locked in the chest, but Harris responded that he could not look at the plates or he and his family would be cursed.

Scribe to Joseph Smith

In February 1828, Harris traveled to Harmony, Pennsylvania to serve as a scribe while Smith dictated the translation of the golden plates. By June 1828, Smith and Harris's work on the translation had resulted in 116 pages of manuscript.

Harris asked Smith for permission to take the 116 pages of manuscript back to his wife to convince her of its authenticity; Smith reluctantly agreed. After Harris had shown the pages to his wife and some others, the manuscript disappeared. The loss temporarily halted the translation of the plates, and when Smith began again, he used other scribes, primarily Oliver Cowdery.

The first extant written revelation to Joseph Smith, dated July 1828, refers to Smith's delivering the 116 pages to Harris. Addressing Smith, the revelation says: "thou deliveredst up that which was sacred, into the hands of a wicked man, who has set at nought the counsels of God, and has broken the most sacred promises, which were made before God, and has depended upon his own judgement, and boasted in his own wisdom."

Book of Mormon financier
Nevertheless, Harris continued to support Smith financially. The translation was completed in June 1829. By August, Smith contracted with publisher E. B. Grandin of Palmyra to print the Book of Mormon. Harris mortgaged his farm to Grandin to ensure payment of the printing costs, and he later sold  of his farm to pay off the mortgage. In March 1830, Smith announced a revelation to Harris: "I command you, that thou shalt not covet thine own property, but impart freely to the printing of the book of Mormon." He warned, "Misery thou shalt receive, if thou wilt slight these counsels: Yea, even destruction of thyself and property. Impart a portion of thy property; Yea, even a part of thy lands and all save the support of thy family. Pay the printer's debt."

Witness to the golden plates

As the translation neared completion, Smith revealed that three men would be called as special witnesses to the existence of the golden plates. Harris, along with Oliver Cowdery and David Whitmer, was chosen as one of the Three Witnesses.

In the words of David Whitmer, one of the other two witnesses, "It was in the latter part of June, 1829... Joseph, Oliver Cowdery and myself were together, and the angel showed them [the plates] to us.... [We were] sitting on a log when we were overshadowed by a light more glorious than that of the sun. In the midst of this light, but a few feet from us, appeared a table upon which were many golden plates, also the sword of Laban and the directors. I saw them as plain as I see you now, and distinctly heard the voice of the Lord declaring that the records of the plates of the Book of Mormon were translated by the gift and power of God."

Joseph Smith and Martin Harris had a similar experience, and as the manuscript was prepared for printing, Cowdery, Whitmer, and Harris signed a joint statement that has been included in each of the more than 120 million copies of the Book of Mormon printed since then. It reads in part:

"And we declare with words of soberness, that an angel of God came down from heaven, and he brought and laid before our eyes, that we beheld and saw the plates, and the engravings thereon; and we know that it is by the grace of God the Father, and our Lord Jesus Christ, that we beheld and bear record that these things are true.

In 1839, Smith indicated that Harris's experience in seeing the plates occurred separately from that of Whitmer and Cowdery. The Three Witnesses's attestation was printed with the book, and it has been included in nearly every subsequent edition.

Marital conflict
In part because of their continued disagreement over the legitimacy of Smith and the golden plates, and because of the loss of his farm, Harris and his wife separated. Lucy Harris was described by Lucy Mack Smith as a woman of "irascible temper". Lucy Harris wrote that Martin Harris beat her often—and neighbors attested to seeing her with bruises and other signs of abuse. She also claimed that her husband may have committed adultery with a neighboring "Mrs. Haggard."

High Priest
Harris became an early member of the Church of Christ, which Smith organized on April 6, 1830.

In 1830, Harris prophesied, '"Jackson would be the last president that we would have; and that all persons who did not embrace Mormonism in two years' time would be stricken off the face of the earth.' He said that Palmyra was to be the New Jerusalem, and that her streets were to be paved with gold.".

On June 3, 1831, at a conference at the headquarters of the church in Kirtland, Ohio, Harris was ordained to the office of high priest and served as a missionary in the Midwest, Pennsylvania, and New York.

On February 12, 1834, Sidney Rigdon charged Harris before the Kirtland High Council, then the chief judicial and legislative council of the church. Among the charges was the allegation that Harris had "told Edqr. A.C. Russell that Joseph drank too much liquor when he was translating the Book of Mormon and that he wrestled with many men and threw them &c. Another charge was, that he exalted himself above Bro. Joseph, in that he said bro. Joseph knew not the contents of the Book of Mormon until after it was translated." Harris reportedly admitted that he "had said many things inadvertently calculating to wound the feelings of his brother and promised to do better. The council forgave him and gave him much good advice."

On February 17, 1834, Harris was ordained a member of Kirtland High Council. In response to the conflicts between Mormons and non-Mormons in Missouri, Harris joined what is now known as Zion's Camp and marched from Kirtland to Clay County, Missouri. Afterwards, Harris, along with Oliver Cowdery and David Whitmer, selected and ordained a "traveling High Council" of 12 men that eventually became the Quorum of the Twelve Apostles. (Some early church leaders claimed that Harris, like Smith and Cowdery, was ordained to the priesthood office of apostle; but there is no record of this ordination, and neither Harris nor Cowdery was ever a member of the Quorum of the Twelve Apostles.)

Marriage to Caroline Young
Lucy Harris died in the summer of 1836, and on November 1, 1836, Harris married Caroline Young, the 22-year-old daughter of Brigham Young's brother, John. Harris was 31 years older than his new wife; they had seven children together.

Split with Joseph Smith
In 1837, dissension arose in Kirtland over the failure of the church's Kirtland Safety Society bank. Harris called it a "fraud" and was among the dissenters who broke with Smith and attempted to reorganize the church, led by Warren Parrish. Smith and Rigdon relocated to Far West, Missouri. In December 1837, Smith and the Kirtland High Council excommunicated 28 individuals, Harris among them.

In 1838, Smith called the Three Witnesses Cowdery, Harris, and Whitmer "too mean to mention; and we had liked to have forgotten them." Parrish's church in Kirtland took control of the temple and became known as The Church of Christ. In its 1838 articles of incorporation, Harris was named one of the church's three trustees.

In 1838, Harris is said to have told "he never saw the plates with his natural eyes, only in vision or imagination." A neighbor of Harris in Kirtland, Ohio, said that Harris "never claimed to have seen [the plates] with his natural eyes, only spiritual vision."

In March 1838, disillusioned church members said that Harris had publicly denied that any of the Witnesses to the Book of Mormon had ever seen or handled the golden plates. Harris's statement reportedly induced five influential members, including three apostles, to leave the church.

By 1839, Parrish and other church leaders had rejected the Book of Mormon and consequently broke with Harris, who continued to testify to its truth.

In June 1841, the Painesville Telegraph reported, "Martin Harris believes that the work in its commencement was a genuine work of the Lord, but that Smith, having become worldly and proud, has been forsaken of the Lord, and has become a knave and impostor. He expects that the work will be yet revived, through other instrumentalities."

Strangite, Whitmerite, Gladdenite, Williamite, Shaker

According to residents of Palmyra, Harris had earlier changed his religion several times, though Harris himself claimed never to have joined a church before he became a Mormon. After the death of Joseph Smith, Harris remained in Kirtland and accepted James Strang as Mormonism's new prophet, one who claimed to have another set of supernatural plates and witnesses to authenticate them. In August 1846, Harris traveled on a mission to England for the Strangite church, but the Mormon conference there declined to hear to him. When he insisted on preaching outside the building, police removed him.

By 1847, Harris had broken with Strang and accepted the leadership claims of fellow Book of Mormon witness David Whitmer. Mormon apostle William E. McLellin organized a Whitmerite congregation in Kirtland, and Harris became a member. By 1851, Harris had accepted another Latter Day Saint factional leader, Gladden Bishop, as prophet and joined Bishop's Kirtland-based organization. In 1855, Harris joined with the last surviving brother of Joseph Smith, William Smith and declared that William was Joseph's true successor. Harris was also briefly intrigued by the "Roll and Book," a scripture that had been supernaturally delivered to the Shakers. By the 1860s, all of those organizations had either dissolved or declined. In 1856, his wife left him to gather with the Mormons in Utah Territory while he remained in Kirtland and gave tours of the temple to curious visitors.

In 1859, Harris gave an interview which described him as "an earnest and sincere advocate of the spiritual and divine authority of the Book of Mormon." It clarified that Harris "does not sympathize with Brigham Young and the Salt Lake Church. He considers them apostates from the true faith; and as being under the influence of the devil.  Mr. Harris says, that the pretended church of the 'Latter Day Saints,' are in reality 'latter day devils,' and that himself and a very few others are the only genuine Mormons left."

Rebaptism into LDS Church

In 1870, at 87, Harris moved to the Utah Territory and, shortly afterward, was rebaptized into the Church of Jesus Christ of Latter-day Saints (LDS Church). Harris, who had been left destitute and without a congregation in Kirtland, accepted the assistance of members of the LDS Church, who raised $200 to help him move west. Harris lived the last four and a half years of his life with relatives in Cache Valley. He died on July 10, 1875, in Clarkston, Utah Territory, and was buried there.

Testimony to the Book of Mormon
Although he was estranged from Mormon leaders for most of his life, Harris continued to testify to the truth of the Book of Mormon. Nevertheless, at least during the early years, Harris "seems to have repeatedly admitted the internal, subjective nature of his visionary experience." The foreman in the Palmyra printing office that produced the first Book of Mormon said that Harris "used to practice a good deal of his characteristic jargon and 'seeing with the spiritual eye,' and the like." John H. Gilbert, the typesetter for most of the book, said that he had asked Harris, "Martin, did you see those plates with your naked eyes?" According to Gilbert, Harris "looked down for an instant, raised his eyes up, and said, 'No, I saw them with a spiritual eye.'" Two other Palmyra residents said that Harris told them that he had seen the plates with "the eye of faith" or "spiritual eyes." In 1838, Harris is said to have told an Ohio congregation that "he never saw the plates with his natural eyes, only in vision or imagination." A neighbor of Harris in Kirtland, Ohio, said that Harris "never claimed to have seen [the plates] with his natural eyes, only spiritual vision."

In March 1838, disillusioned church members said that Harris had publicly denied that any of the Witnesses to the Book of Mormon had ever seen or handled the golden plates—although Harris had not been present when Whitmer and Cowdery first claimed to have viewed them—and they claimed that Harris's recantation, made during a period of crisis in early Mormonism, induced five influential members, including three apostles, to leave the church. Even at the end of his long life, Harris said that he had seen the plates in "a state of entrancement." Nevertheless, in 1853, Harris told one David Dille that he had held the forty- to sixty-pound plates on his knee for "an hour-and-a-half" and handled the plates with his hands, "plate after plate." Even later, Harris affirmed that he had seen the plates and the angel with his natural eyes: "Gentlemen," holding out his hand, "do you see that hand? Are you sure you see it? Or are your eyes playing you a trick or something? No. Well, as sure as you see my hand so sure did I see the Angel and the plates." The following year Harris affirmed that "No man heard me in any way deny the truth of the Book of Mormon [or] the administration of the angel that showed me the plates."

At the end of his life, Harris responded when he was asked if he still believed in Smith and the Book of Mormon: "Do I believe it! Do you see the sun shining! Just as surely as the sun is shining on us and gives us light, and the [moon] and stars give us light by night, just as surely as the breath of life sustains us, so surely do I know that Joseph Smith was a true prophet of God, chosen of God to open the last dispensation of the fulness of times; so surely do I know that the Book of Mormon was divinely translated. I saw the plates; I saw the Angel; I heard the voice of God. I know that the Book of Mormon is true and that Joseph Smith was a true prophet of God. I might as well doubt my own existence as to doubt the divine authenticity of the Book of Mormon or the divine calling of Joseph Smith."

On his death bed, Harris said: "The Book of Mormon is no fake. I know what I know. I have seen what I have seen and I have heard what I have heard. I have seen the gold plates from which the Book of Mormon is written. An angel appeared to me and others and testified to the truthfulness of the record, and had I been willing to have perjured myself and sworn falsely to the testimony I now bear I could have been a rich man, but I could not have testified other than I have done and am now doing for these things are true."

Memorial, art, and popular culture
The Martin Harris Gravesite near Clarkston, Utah is listed on the National Register of Historic Places.
 A pageant about Harris called "Martin Harris, The Man Who Knew", sponsored by the LDS Church, was performed every other year in August in Clarkston until 2018
 Martin Harris was a named character in the 2003 episode of South Park "All About Mormons".

Notes

References

.
.
.
.
.
.
.
.
.

Further reading
 Tuckett, Madge Harris, and Belle Haris Wilson. The Martin Harris Story: with Biographies of Emer Harris and Dennison Lott Harris. Pleasant Grove, Utah: Vintage Books, 1983. N.B.: The co-authors are descendants of the family of the brothers Martin and Emer Harris. Without ISBN

External links
 
 
 
 , on Grampa Bill's G.A. Pages, by William O. Lewis III.
 
 Nathan Harris and Rhoda Lapham Family, parents of Martin Harris, annotated genealogy.

1783 births
1875 deaths
American Latter Day Saint leaders
American Latter Day Saint missionaries
Angelic visionaries
Apostles of the Church of Christ (Latter Day Saints)
Book of Mormon witnesses
Converts to Mormonism
Doctrine and Covenants people
Latter Day Saint missionaries in the United States
Latter Day Saints from New York (state)
People from Easton, New York
People from Palmyra, New York
Religious leaders from New York (state)
Harold B. Lee Library-related 19th century articles